The Americas Zone was one of three zones of regional competition in the 2015 Fed Cup.

Group I 
 Venue: La Loma Sports Centre, San Luis Potosí, Mexico (Hard)
 Dates: 4–7 February

The seven teams were divided into one pool of three and one pool of four teams. The two pool winners took part in play-offs to determine the nation advancing to the World Group II play-offs. The nations finished last in their pools took part in relegation play-offs, with the losing nation being relegated to Group II for 2015.

Pools

Play-offs 

  advanced to World Group II play-offs

Group II 
 Venue: Centro Nacional de Tenis, Santo Domingo Este, Dominican Republic (Hard)
 Dates: 24–27 June

The twelve teams were divided into four pools of three teams. The four pool winners took part in play-offs to determine the two nations advancing to Americas Zone Group I in 2016.

Play-offs 

  and  advanced to Americas Zone Group I in 2016

References 

 Fed Cup Result, 2015 Americas Group I
 Fed Cup Result, 2015 Americas Group II

External links 
 Fed Cup website

 
Americas
Sport in San Luis Potosí City
Tennis tournaments in Mexico
2015 in Mexican tennis